KCUK is a non-commercial radio station in Chevak, Alaska, broadcasting on 88.1 FM. It includes local programming, plus programming from National Public Radio and Native Voice One.

External links
 KCUK official website
 

1987 establishments in Alaska
CUK
Buildings and structures in Kusilvak Census Area, Alaska
Native American radio
NPR member stations
Radio stations established in 1987